José Reinaldo de Lima (born 11 January 1957) is a former Brazilian footballer who played as a striker. He is popularly known as Reinaldo or Rei (The King). Widely regarded as one of the greatest strikers in the history of Brazilian football, Reinaldo played most of his career for Atlético Mineiro, is considered by many the most important player in the club, and still holds the record of highest goal average per game in the Brazilian league, with 1.55 goals per match in the 1977 Brazilian Championship, at a time when Atlético Mineiro was regarded to have one of the best teams in the world.

Legendary Brazilian midfielder Zico considered him the best player he had ever seen, believing that he would have been the greatest Brazilian player after Pelé if not for injuries.

Clubs and years active
Reinaldo played 30 matches and scored 14 goals for the Brazilian national team between July 1975 and May 1985, including the 1978 FIFA World Cup, where he scored one goal against Sweden. He also scored the qualifying goal for Brazil's participation in the 1982 FIFA World Cup held in Spain, but was not included on the team, apparently due to injury.

Records and awards
Reinaldo scored a club record of 255 goals for Clube Atlético Mineiro. He also averaged 1.55 goals per match in the 1977 season—scoring 28 goals in 18 matches— the record average for the Brazilian League, for which Atlético supporters nicknamed him The King ("o Rei", in Portuguese, which also served as a pun on his name).
He won eight Campeonato Mineiro titles including six consecutively:  in 1976, 1978–1983 and 1985.

Subsequent career
Reinaldo is still remembered by Atlético Mineiro supporters. In 2004, he was elected in Belo Horizonte to represent the Partido dos Trabalhadores (Brazilian Workers' Party).

Honours

Club

Atlético Mineiro 

 Copa dos Campeões da Copa Brasil: 1978
 Campeonato Mineiro: 1976, 1978, 1979, 1980, 1981, 1982 e 1983

International

Brazil 

 Taça da França: 1981
 Taça da Inglaterra: 1981

Individual 
 Campeonato Brasileiro Série A Top Scorer: 1977 (28 goals)
 Bola de Prata da Revista Placar (artilheiro do Campeonato Brasileiro - 28 gols: 1977)
 Bola de Prata da Revista Placar (seleção do Campeonato Brasileiro: 1977 e 1983)

Record 

 Top scorer with the highest average of goals in a single Brazilian Championship (28 goals in 18 matches, average of 1.55 per game): 1977

References

1957 births
Living people
Brazilian footballers
Brazilian football managers
Brazilian expatriate footballers
Expatriate footballers in Sweden
Expatriate footballers in the Netherlands
Association football forwards
1975 Copa América players
1978 FIFA World Cup players
Brazil international footballers
Brazilian sportsperson-politicians
Campeonato Brasileiro Série A players
Workers' Party (Brazil) politicians
Clube Atlético Mineiro players
Sociedade Esportiva Palmeiras players
Atlético Rio Negro Clube players
Cruzeiro Esporte Clube players
BK Häcken players
SC Telstar players
Valeriodoce Esporte Clube managers
Esporte Clube Mamoré managers
Villa Nova Atlético Clube managers
Ipatinga Futebol Clube managers